Pagé is a surname. 

Notable people with this surname include:

 François-Xavier Pagé (1833–1912), Canadian politician
 Ilse Pagé (born 1939), German actress
 Lorraine Pagé (born 1947), Canadian politician
 Michel Pagé (1949–2013), Canadian politician
 Pierre Pagé (born 1948), Canadian ice hockey coach
 Suzanne Pagé (born 1941), French museum curator
 Sylvain Pagé (born 1961), Canadian politician

Other
 Capitán Juan Pagé, Salta Province, Argentina

See also
 Page (disambiguation)